The Last Train may refer to:

Film and television
 The Last Train (2002 film), a Uruguayan and Argentinian comedy-drama film
 The Last Train (2006 film), a German drama
 The Last Train (TV series), a 1999 British, six-part, post-apocalyptic television drama series
 The Last Train, winner of the 2003 Thessaloniki International Film Festival

Other uses
 Last Train (bridge), a bidding convention in the card game contract bridge
 "Last Train" (Christine Anu and Paul Kelly song), 1993
 "Last Train" (Tiësto and Firebeatz song), 2014
 "The Last Train", a 1950 short story by Fredric Brown

See also
 Last Train Home (disambiguation)